The 1898 New Hampshire football team was an American football team that represented New Hampshire College of Agriculture and the Mechanic Arts during the 1898 college football season—the school became the University of New Hampshire in 1923. The team finished with a record of 3–5 or 4–4, per 1898 sources or modern sources, respectively.

Schedule
Scoring during this era awarded five points for a touchdown, one point for a conversion kick (extra point), and five points for a field goal. Teams played in the one-platoon system and the forward pass was not yet legal. Games were played in two halves rather than four quarters.

The 81 points scored by New Hampshire on October 15 surpass program records of most points scored (70) and greatest margin of victory (66) as listed in the New Hampshire media guide; however, this game was played against a high school team.

The November 2 game was the first meeting between the New Hampshire and MIT varsity football programs.

The New Hampshire team left the field early in the second half of the November 12 game, due to rough play. The contemporary game recap published in The Portsmouth Herald notes that the referee "awarded it to Portsmouth six to nothing." The score on the field had been 11–0 in favor of New Hampshire at the time the game was abandoned.

Roster

Source:

Notes

References

Further reading
 

New Hampshire
New Hampshire Wildcats football seasons
New Hampshire football